Julia Parker (née Lethbridge; born 1932, Plymouth, Devon) is an astrologer and author who, often in partnership with her  husband Derek Parker, has written many popular and introductory books on astrology.

Biography
The most notable of Parker's books is the Compleat Astrologer, initially published in London in 1970, subsequently published in seventeen countries, and selling over a million copies. This has remained in print for over 30 years.  The Compleat Astrologer has become known as the archetypal 'coffee-table' book on astrology and the first key reference source for many well-known professional astrologers.  A revised and expanded edition, retitled The New Compleat Astrologer, was published by Random House in 1990, and gained renown for being "graphically stunning" and for its comprehensive treatment of astrology at a layman's level.

Julia Parker studied astrology at the Faculty of Astrological Studies in London. Later she became its secretary, and then its president for twelve years. She retains the role of patron. She has also acted as a trustee of the Urania Trust, a registered astrological charity.

Julia Parker has featured in many television programs and has written popular horoscope columns for Cosmopolitan, Company, Woman's Own and Good Housekeeping in the UK, and the Hong Kong Tatler. She resides in Sydney and describes herself as a designer and artist.

Publications
Publications in collaboration with Derek Parker are marked with "+".

The Compleat Astrologer (1971 +), Random House, 
The Compleat Lover (1972, +)
Derek and Julia Parker's Love Signs (1973 +)
The Compleat Astrologers' Love Signs (1974 +)
The Immortals (1976 +)
The Story and the Song: British musical comedy, (1979 +)
How do you Know Who you Are? (1980 +)
Do It Yourself Health (1982 +)
A History of Astrology (1983 +)   
The New Compleat Astrologer (1984 +) 
Dreaming (1985 +)
Life Signs (1986 +)
A Traveller's Guide to Egypt + (1986)
The Future Now (1988 +)
A Traveller's Guide to Cyprus (1989 +)
A World Atlas of the Supernatural (1990 +)
The Secret World of your Dreams (1990 +)
Parkers' Astrology (1991, 2009 +)   
The Power of Magic (1992 +)
The Sun and Moon Signs Library (1992 +)
Face Facts (1993 +)
The Complete Book of Dreams (1995 +)
Hearts of Fire (fiction,1995)
The Stars Shine Bright (fiction, 1995)
Love Signs (1996 +)
Sun & Moon Signs, (1996 +), Dorling Kindersley (London), 
Parkers' Astrology Pack (1997 +)
Parkers' Prediction Pack (1998 +)
The KISS Guide to Astrology (2000 +) 
Astrology (2007 +), Dorling Kindersley (London)
The Companion Guide to Astrology (2008 +)  
Parkers' Encyclopedia of Astrology (2010 +), Watkins Publishing (London) 
Building Sydney's History (2011 +), Arcadia Publishing (Mount Pleasant, SC),

References

1932 births
Living people
Australian astrologers
20th-century astrologers
21st-century astrologers
Australian women novelists
English astrologers
Writers from Plymouth, Devon
British emigrants to Australia